Elias Löder (born 25 April 2000) is a German professional footballer who plays as a midfielder for  club Hallescher FC.

References

External links

2000 births
Living people
German footballers
Association football midfielders
1. FC Magdeburg players
FC Erzgebirge Aue players
VfB Germania Halberstadt players
Hallescher FC players
3. Liga players
Regionalliga players